Orland Township is one of 29 townships in Cook County, Illinois, USA.  As of the 2010 census, its population was 97,558.

Geography
It includes the entire village of Orland Hills, almost all of Orland Park, as well as a large portion of Tinley Park.

Boundaries
Orland Township is bordered by Harlem Avenue (Illinois Route 43) on the east, 135th Street on the north, Will-Cook Road on the west (where Cook County and Will County share a border), and 183rd Street on the south (which is also the Cook-Will county border).

Cities, towns, villages
 Orland Hills
 Orland Park (vast majority)
 Tinley Park (half)

Unincorporated towns
 Alpine at 
 Fernway at 
 Fernway Park at

Ghost Town
 Westhaven at

Adjacent townships
 Palos Township (north)
 Worth Township (northeast)
 Bremen Township (east)
 Rich Township (southeast)
 Frankfort Township, Will County (south)
 New Lenox Township, Will County (southwest)
 Homer Township, Will County (west)
 Lemont Township (northwest)

Cemeteries
The township contains these five cemeteries: Cooper, German Methodist, Old German Methodist, Orland Park Memorial, and Tinley Park Memorial.

Major highways
  U.S. Route 6
  Illinois Route 7
  U.S. Route 45
  Illinois Route 43

Lakes
 Ashbourne Lake
 Laguna Lake
 Turtlehead Lake

Landmarks
 Orland Grove Forest Preserve (south three-quarters)
 Orland Tract Forest Preserve
 Tinley Creek Woods (Cook County Forest Preserves) (west three-quarters)

Demographics

Politics
There are many political organizations in Orland Township. The Regular Democratic Organization for Orland Township, represents all Democratic candidates.

In the 2020 United States presidential election, Orland township was one of only four suburban Cook County townships to vote for the Republican Party ticket of incumbents Donald Trump and Mike Pence over the Democratic Party ticket of Joe Biden and Kamala Harris. The other three townships which voted Republican were Lemont, Norwood Park, and Palos. The township had a turnout of 74.4%, and cast 27,853 votes for the Republican ticket and 26,261 for the Democratic ticket.

Political districts
The following political districts contain portions of the township:

 Illinois's 1st congressional district
 Illinois's 3rd congressional district
 State House District 28
 State House District 35
 State House District 37
 State House District 81
 State Senate District 14
 State Senate District 18
 State Senate District 19
 State Senate District 41

References
 
 United States Census Bureau 2007 TIGER/Line Shapefiles
 United States National Atlas

External links
 Orland Township official website
 History of Orland, Il.
 City-Data.com
 Illinois State Archives
 Township Officials of Illinois
 Cook County official site

Townships in Cook County, Illinois
Townships in Illinois